Martialia hyadesii is a species of flying squid commonly known as the sevenstar flying squid.

Distribution
M. hyadesii occurs in epipelagic and mesopelagic waters of the Southern Ocean. Its range may be circumpolar with a Sub-Antarctic distribution.

Ecology
These large squid are known to prey upon deep-sea ridgeheads and other mesopelagic fish, and to be preyed upon in turn by king penguins and albatrosses.

References

Squid
Molluscs of the Atlantic Ocean
Molluscs of the Pacific Ocean
Fauna of the Southern Ocean
Cephalopods of South America
Marine molluscs of Africa
Molluscs described in 1889
Taxa named by Alphonse Trémeau de Rochebrune
Taxa named by Jules François Mabille